Margarita Ervandovna Ter-Minassian (16 May 19109 April 1995) was a Soviet entomologist and specialist for weevils (Curculionoidea) and seed beetles (Bruchinae). Her name is sometimes transcribed as Ter-Minasian or Ter-Minasyan.

Biography
Ter-Minassian was born in the German city of Leipzig, while her father was staying there for education. She got her secondary education in Echiadzin, and was a student at Yerevan State University from 1926. After graduating, she continued her education in 1932 at the Zoological Institute of the USSR Academy of Sciences in Leningrad.
She published more than 170 scientific works, also describing many new species. She is mostly known for her two monographs on weevils of the subfamily Lixinae.

Selected bibliography
Ter-Minassian, M. E. (1967): Zhuki-dolgonosiki podsemejstva Cleoninae fauny SSSR. Tsvetozhily i stebleedy (triba Lixini). Nauka, Leningrad, 140 + 1 p. (English translation published as: Weevils of the Subfamily Cleoninae in the Fauna of the USSR. Tribe Lixini. USDA Agricultural Research Service, Washington, D. C. by Amerind Publishing Co. Pvt. Ltd., New Delhi, 1978. 166 pp.).
Ter-Minasian M. E. (1988): Zhuki-dolgonosiki podsemeystva Cleoninae fauny SSSR: Kornevye dolgonosiki (triba Cleonini). Nauka, Leningrad, 235 p. (English translation of the title: Weevils of the Subfamily Cleoninae in the Fauna of the USSR. Tribe Cleonini.)

References 

Coleopterists
Soviet entomologists
Scientists from Leipzig
Yerevan State University alumni
Women entomologists